Rolling elections are elections in which all representatives in a body are elected, but these elections are spread over a period of time rather than all at once. Examples are the presidential primaries in the United States, Elections to the European Parliament (where, due to differing election laws in each member state, elections are held on different days of the same week) and, due to logistics, general elections in Lebanon and India. The voting procedure in the Legislative Assemblies of the Roman Republic are also a classical example.

In rolling elections, voters have information about previous voters' choices. While in the first elections, there may be plenty of hopeful candidates, in the last rounds consensus on one winner is generally achieved. In today's context of rapid communication, candidates can put disproportionate resources into competing strongly in the first few stages, because those stages affect the reaction of latter stages.

Elections